Marcelo Guadalupe Alatorre Maldonado (born 18 January 1985 in Guadalajara, Jalisco, México) is a former Mexican footballer, who last played as defender.

References

1985 births
Living people
Footballers from Jalisco
Footballers from Guadalajara, Jalisco
Association football defenders
Tecos F.C. footballers
Leones Negros UdeG footballers
Club Universidad Nacional footballers
C.D. Veracruz footballers
Venados F.C. players
Liga MX players
Las Vegas Lights FC players
Mexican footballers